Solier may refer to:

 François Solier (1558-1638), French Jesuit theologian
 Antoine Joseph Jean Solier (1792–1851), French naturalist, entomologist and plant collector
 Jean-Pierre Solier (1755–1812), French cellist and operatic singer
 Magaly Solier (born 1986), Peruvian actress and recording artist

See also
 Soliers, a commune in Basse-Normandie region, France